Phyllobolites is a genus of fungi in the family Boletaceae. The genus is monotypic, containing the single species Phyllobolites miniatus, found in tropical South America.

References

External links
 

Boletaceae
Fungi of South America
Monotypic Boletales genera
Taxa named by Rolf Singer